Trichodes graecus is a beetle species of checkered beetles belonging to the family Cleridae, subfamily Clerinae. It was described by Winkler & Zirovnicky in 1980 and is endemic to Greece.

References

graecus
Beetles described in 1980
Endemic fauna of Greece